Pernes may refer to several communes in France:

 Pernes, Pas-de-Calais
 Bailleul-lès-Pernes, Pas-de-Calais
 La Roque-sur-Pernes, Vaucluse
 Pernes-lès-Boulogne, Pas-de-Calais
 Pernes-les-Fontaines, Vaucluse
 Sains-lès-Pernes, Pas-de-Calais

See also
 Perne, a surname